Edward P. Ra (born November 4, 1981) is a member of the New York State Assembly, representing the 19th district, which includes portions of the towns of Hempstead, North Hempstead and Oyster Bay in Nassau County on Long Island. A Republican, Ra was first elected in 2010.

Ra was born in Mineola, New York and raised in Franklin Square, New York, where he still resides with his wife Laura. He earned a B.A. in computer science from Loyola College in 2004. He received his Juris Doctor from St. John's University School of Law in 2007 and LL.M. in Intellectual Property Law from Benjamin N. Cardozo School of Law in 2008. Prior to entering elected office, Ra served as the deputy town attorney for the Town of Hempstead, where the Town Attorney is his father, Joseph Ra. He was also a legal aide in the Office of the New York State Attorney General.

In 2010, Assemblyman Thomas Alfano decided not to seek reelection, and Ra entered the race to succeed him. Ra defeated Democrat Patrick Nicolosi. Since his initial election, he has never faced serious opposition. In 2018, Ra defeated Democrat Bill Carr 55% to 45%, his closest race since the 2010 election.

References

External links
New York Assemblyman Edward P. Ra (R-Franklin Square)

1981 births
Living people
Republican Party members of the New York State Assembly
Loyola University Maryland alumni
St. John's University School of Law alumni
People from Mineola, New York
People from Franklin Square, New York
Benjamin N. Cardozo School of Law alumni
New York (state) lawyers
21st-century American politicians